The Central Sofia Market Hall, known popularly simply as The Market Hall (Халите, Halite) is a covered market in the centre of Sofia, the capital of Bulgaria, located on Marie Louise Boulevard. It was opened in 1911 and is today an important trade centre in the city.

History
The construction of the building, which spreads over 3,200 m², began in 1909 after the design of architect Naum Torbov was selected in 1907, and took two years to complete. 

Until the late 1940s the Sofia municipality let out about 170 shops and stalls in the Central Sofia Market Hall. The rents and the product quality were strictly regulated. The market hall building's interior was significantly altered after the 1950s and the market was closed in 1988 in order to be reconstructed, modernized and once again opened for Easter in 2000, after 75% of it was acquired by the Israeli company Ashtrom, who invested $7 million in it.

Today the Central Sofia Market Hall employs over 1,000 people, has three storeys, and offers foodstuff stalls and shops, clothing, accessories and jewellery shops, fast food stalls, etc.

Architecture

The style of the building, which is regarded as Torbov's best work, is Neo-Renaissance, featuring also elements of Neo-Byzantine architecture and Neo-Baroque. The façade is known for its relief of the coat of arms of Sofia above the main entrance created by the artist Haralampi Tachev. The famous little clock tower with three dials tops the edifice. The building was originally constructed with four entrances, though not all are used today.

Gallery

References

Buildings and structures in Sofia
Market halls
Tourist attractions in Sofia
Buildings and structures completed in 1911
Byzantine Revival architecture in Bulgaria
Renaissance Revival architecture in Bulgaria